Mustapha Sdad (born 11 April 1970) is a Moroccan hurdler. He competed in the men's 400 metres hurdles at the 2000 Summer Olympics.

References

1970 births
Living people
Athletes (track and field) at the 2000 Summer Olympics
Moroccan male hurdlers
Olympic athletes of Morocco
Place of birth missing (living people)
Mediterranean Games bronze medalists for Morocco
Mediterranean Games medalists in athletics
Athletes (track and field) at the 1993 Mediterranean Games
20th-century Moroccan people
21st-century Moroccan people